Gabe Martin (born June 5, 1992) is a former American football inside linebacker. He played college football at Bowling Green.

College career
A three-year starter at Bowling Green, Martin played in 45 games (30 starts) and finished his career with 246 tackles (144 solo), 30 tackles for loss, 10 sacks, three interceptions, 13 passes defensed, four forced fumbles, and a fumble recovery.

Professional career

Arizona Cardinals
Martin signed with the Cardinals as an undrafted free agent following the 2015 NFL Draft. He was released on September 5, 2015, and signed to Cardinals practice squad two days later. He was elevated to active roster on January 12, 2016.

On November 18, 2016, Martin was placed on injured reserve with a knee injury.

On February 27, 2017, Martin signed a one-year contract extension with the Cardinals. On August 5, 2017, he was waived/injured by the Cardinals and placed on injured reserve. He was waived from IR on August 9, 2017.

New Orleans Saints
On October 3, 2017, Martin was signed by the New Orleans Saints, but was released a week later and re-signed to the practice squad.

Arizona Cardinals (second stint)
On November 28, 2017, Martin was signed by the Cardinals off the Saints' practice squad. He was waived/injured on May 1, 2018, after suffering a torn Achilles in the offseason and was placed on injured reserve.

References

External links
Bowling Green Falcons bio
Arizona Cardinals bio

1992 births
Living people
Players of American football from Michigan
People from Grand Blanc, Michigan
American football linebackers
Bowling Green Falcons football players
Arizona Cardinals players
New Orleans Saints players